The CSA PS-38 Tourer is a Czech light-sport aircraft under development by Czech Sport Aircraft of Prague, introduced at the AERO Friedrichshafen show in 2014. The aircraft is intended to be supplied complete and ready-to-fly.

Design and development
The PS-38 Tourer was designed for private use for cross-country flying as well as the law enforcement role.

The aircraft was designed to comply with the US light-sport aircraft rules. It features a cantilever high-wing, an enclosed cabin with two-seats-in-side-by-side configuration accessed by doors, fixed tricycle landing gear and a single engine in tractor configuration.

The aircraft is made with an aluminum semi-monocoque structure. The standard engine used is the  Rotax 912ULS four-stroke powerplant. The forward-swept wing provides improved visibility to the pilot in turns.

As of January 2018, the design does not appear on the Federal Aviation Administration's list of approved special light-sport aircraft.

The design also did not appear on the manufacturer's website as offered for sale in February 2017.

Specifications (PS-38 Tourer)

References

PS-38 Tourer
2010s Czech sport aircraft
Light-sport aircraft
Single-engined tractor aircraft
High-wing aircraft